Chinnaswamy Muniyappa (born 1 January 1977) is an Indian professional golfer.

Muniyappa turned professional in 1997. He has won once on the Asian Tour.

Professional wins (2)

Asian Tour wins (1)

Asian Tour playoff record (1–0)

Professional Golf Tour of India wins (1)

Results in World Golf Championships

"T" = Tied

External links

Indian male golfers
Asian Tour golfers
Golfers from Karnataka
Sportspeople from Bangalore
1977 births
Living people